In June 1992 a by-election was held for the New Delhi seat in the Lok Sabha (lower house of the parliament of India). The by-election was called after the resignation of the incumbent Member of Parliament L.K. Advani.

Background
Bharatiya Janata Party leader Advani had won the New Delhi Lok Sabha seat in the 1989 and 1991 general elections. However, Advani had also won the Gandhinagar Lok Sabha seat in Gujarat in 1991, and thus opted to resign from the New Delhi seat.

The by-election was originally scheduled for November 1991, but was countermanded after the death of candidate Mukesh Kumar Garg of Kanpur.

Candidates
A whopping 125 candidates contested the by-election. The two main candidates were Bollywood star actors. The Indian National Congress fielded film star Rajesh Khanna as their candidate in the by-election. Khanna had contested against Advani in the 1991 election in New Delhi, and lost by a mere 1,589 votes. In the 1992 by-election his main opponent was another actor, Shatrughan Sinha of the BJP. Sinha, nicknamed 'Shotgun', had campaigned for the non-Congress opposition in the 1989, but without affiliating with any party at the time. In his 1992 campaign Sinha adopted a tough stance against Khanna and Prime Minister P.V. Narasimha Rao, challenging the Congress government on election promises made in the 1991 campaign. India Today compared his election rhetoric to his performance as the rogue Chhannoo in the 1971 hit Mere Apne. BJP leaders campaigning on behalf of Sinha included Uma Bharti, Madan Lal Khurana, and Vijay Kumar Malhotra. Advani was notably absent from the campaign.

Khanna's campaigners included H.K.L. Bhagat, R.K. Dhawan, and Vidya Charan Shukla. It was reported that H.K.L. Bhagat had also sought the Congress nomination for the by-election.

The wives of the two contending film stars, Dimple Kapadia and Poonam Sinha, played a prominent role in mobilizing crowds for their husband's campaign rallies.

Jai Bhagwan Jatav stood as the Janata Dal candidate in the by-election. Jatav was expected to do well amongst Muslim voters. In the buildup to the demolition of the Babri Masjid later in 1992, Muslims tended to perceive P.V. Narasimha Rao's Congress as taking a soft stance on the advance of the Hindutva movement.

Independent candidate Phoolan Devi, known internationally as the 'Bandit Queen', was in jail at the time of the by-election. Devi had been imprisoned without trial since 1983 on around 50 charges, including murder.

Result

The election was won by R. Khanna. The by-election victory was interpreted as an important victory for the Congress government of P.V. Narasimha Rao.

Khanna failed to be re-elected from New Delhi in 1996. Sinha was elected to the Rajya Sabha in 1996, and would later become a Union Minister. In his 2016 autobiography Anything but Khamoosh, Sinha expressed regret over having contested the 1992 by-election against fellow actor Khanna.

References

Lok Sabha by-elections
1992 elections in India
Elections in Delhi
1990s in Delhi
New Delhi